Sir Henry Evan Murchison James  (20 January 1846 – 20 August 1923) was a British civil servant in the Indian Civil Service from 1865 to 1900.

He was the Commissioner in Sind from 1891 to 1900.

Official duties
He formally opened Dayaram Jethmal Sind College on 15 October 1893 in Karachi.

After stepping down as Commissioner, he was knighted as a Knight Commander of the Order of the Indian Empire (KCIE) in the 1901 New Year Honours List.

Travel to China
In 1886–1887, James used a two-year leave to travel to China. Together with two younger Britons, the officer Francis Younghusband and the diplomat Harry English Fulford, he explored Manchuria, travelling through the frontier areas of Chinese settlement in the region and to the Changbai Mountains. He published his travel notes, and a solid dose of background information, in a book, The Long White Mountain, or, A journey in Manchuria.... Over a century later, the factual material contained in a work still served as a major source for the historians of the region.

Named after
The town of Jamesabad in Thar and Parker District of Sind was named after him.

Works

References

External links

 

1846 births
1923 deaths
Indian Civil Service (British India) officers
Knights Commander of the Order of the Indian Empire
Companions of the Order of the Star of India
Members of the Bombay Legislative Council